Sir John Spring may refer to:

John Spring (MP for Northampton), in 1399 MP for Northampton
Sir John Spring of Lavenham (died 1547), English merchant and politician
Sir John Spring, 5th Baronet (1674–1740), English baronet
Sir John Spring, 6th Baronet (died 1769), English baronet
John Spring (cricketer) (1833–1907), New Zealand cricketer
John Hopkins Spring  (1862–1933), San Francisco real estate developer, see John Hopkins Spring Estate